Relay, Maryland, or Relay House, Maryland, was formerly an important junction and rail stop on the Baltimore and Ohio Railroad, located  west of Baltimore, Maryland. It was the busiest station on the line except for Baltimore itself. A town grew up around it: a general store, a school, and a volunteer fire company. Although the neighborhood is still inhabited, only the ghost of the town survives. There is no longer town government, a post office, nor are there any stores. The former fire house, at 1710 Arlington Avenue, at one point the town hall, has survived and is available for rental for events. In 2021 Relay is a historic district of Halethorpe, Maryland, near the intersection of today's Viaduct and Railroad Avenues. There is a Relay Elementary School.

The Relay House Station
Several different buildings were built at approximately the same point on the rail line, and they are often confused.

 The original Relay House, a frame building which survives in 2021, though rebuilt after a fire, and it looks different. It was the station before the line to Washington opened and the route of the main line slightly changed.
 The Relay House Station, at the intersection of the two train lines (demolished at unknown date)
 The Viaduct Hotel, sometimes called the Relay Hotel, built of stone (demolished in 1950).

The original Relay House

The Relay House was a 3-story, 32-room restaurant-inn-stables, built for the use of horse-drawn cars traveling between Baltimore and Ellicott's Mills; this was the first part built of what would become the Railroad's main line to Wheeling, Virginia (since 1863, West Virginia). The main cargo at that time was barrels of flour from the mills, taken to Baltimore. Passenger service was also provided.

The "relays" were horses, that would be swapped at the Relay House.

In 1830 there took place the famous, perhaps mythical, race between a horse and a demonstration locomotive engine, the Tom Thumb, the first locomotive built in America. The race began at Baltimore and ended at the Relay House. The engine misfunctioned and the horse won, but the viability of steam locomotives was successfully demonstrated.

This building survives and in 2021 is a private residence, although because of fire damage and subsequent repairs its appearance is different. It is slightly set back from the two buildings about to be mentioned; when the Viaduct was opened the tracks were slightly relocated and the line no longer passed immediately in front of the Relay House. Some remnants of the original, long-unused 1830 tracks remain. Link to picture of this building.

The Relay Station

In 1835 the Thomas Viaduct opened, providing the first rail service to Washington, D.C., and the use of horses was discontinued. (In 2022 the Viaduct is still in regular use.) The tracks were slightly relocated, meaning the Relay House was no longer adjacent to the tracks. New platforms with benches and roofs were built along the tracks, but the Relay House was still close enough that trains could stop for meal breaks. On railroad maps and timetables the station is called "Relay". 1878 B&O Railroad Map

Before the Civil War, it was a station and an important junction and transfer point on the Baltimore and Ohio Railroad, where the track from Washington, D.C., merged into the Railroad's main Baltimore–Wheeling line. There was a wye junction. It was the most complicated station on the line, and the 2nd busiest, after Baltimore. The names Relay and Relay House occur frequently in the reports on John Brown's raid on Harpers Ferry, the last major event before the  Civil War caused operations on the line to be shut down.

The Viaduct Hotel

After the war and much repair (the B & O Railroad Potomac River Crossing at Harpers Ferry was blown up, among other things), normal traffic could resume. In 1872 the Railroad built a four-story, granite Victorian-style combination hotel and station, called the Viaduct Hotel; it was also referred to as the Relay Hotel. It was not a conventional hotel; it was for the use of train crew and passengers. Trains would have scheduled meal stops. Passengers changing trains might have to spend some hours in Relay. There was a barber and a post office. It was also used for B&O meetings and dinners, and as housing for railroad workers.

By about 1900, faster intercity trains and the introduction of dining cars and sleeping cars made the Viaduct Hotel obsolete. It gradually lost customers and closed in 1938; it was demolished in 1950. A marker formerly at the site of the hotel/station is now in the Baltimore and Ohio Railroad Museum, in Baltimore. A miniature recreation of the hotel has been built.

References

Further reading
 

Baltimore and Ohio Railroad
Railway stations in Baltimore County, Maryland
Former Baltimore and Ohio Railroad stations
Halethorpe, Maryland
Ghost towns in Maryland